Harout Arthur Der-Hovagimian (sometimes spelled "Ter-Hovakimyan"; born 22 February 1974) is a Canadian-Armenian composer, songwriter and record producer.

Career
Harout Arthur Der-Hovagimian signed his first recording contract at the age of 17 with the newly found Canadian record label Hi-Bias Records. For the following 15 years, he was mainly credited under his stage name "Mark Ryan".

For years, his main focus was his Temperance project. Starting out as a solo Tech house project, his debut commercial release was the five-track Phantasy EP, released early 1992. Temperance eventually crossed over into a more Dance-pop/Eurodance sound with the inclusion of Mark's schoolmate Lorraine Reid on vocals.  Their first hit "Music Is My Life" was released in 1994, followed by a number of other hits, worldwide licenses, numerous Juno Award Nominations.

By 19, Mark's on the side successful remix works also led to Billboard magazine titling him one of the top remixers from Canada. In 1996, Temperance peaked with its hi-nrg cover version of the 1980s hit "Forever Young".

In 1997, after the releases of S.P.O.T. (Side Project of Temperance) and the Temperance single "Universal Dream", Mark parted ways to launch 22 Green Productions, primarily focusing on producing and remixing various local and international artists, such as soulDecision, 666, Vapourspace, Urban Cookie Collective, Mia Minx, Emjay, and more.

His song "Qele Qele" performed by Sirusho was Armenia's entry in the Eurovision Song Contest 2008.  DerHova composed the song, thought up the title, and produced the original and remix versions of the song. Out of 43 participating countries, it went on to rank 4th (Armenia's highest position in the main song contest, equalled in 2014), and received the most 12 points in the competition.

On September 5, 2010, his production of Mama performed by Vladimir Arzumanyan, was selected as Armenia's entry in the Junior Eurovision Song Contest 2010.  On November 20, the song went on to collect the most points (including the most 12 points) to win the contest, Armenia's first Victory at any level of Eurovision.

Personal life
DerHova currently resides in Yerevan, Armenia.

References

External links
CBCMusic
Official Website

Armenian composers
Armenian DJs
Canadian people of Armenian descent
Canadian pop musicians
Canadian record producers
Canadian electronic musicians
Musicians from Toronto
Living people
1974 births
Grammy Award winners
Canadian male singer-songwriters
Electronic dance music DJs
21st-century Canadian male singers